Nour El-Dali ( October 24, 1928 – April 16, 2004) was an Egyptian footballer who played for Zamalek and Egypt as a defender, represented his country and was part of the team that won the 1957 Africa Cup of Nations. He was also part of Egypt's squad for the football tournament at the 1952 Summer Olympics, but he did not play in any matches. He was the president of Zamalek Sports Club for 2 years, between 1990 and 1992.

Honors

As a player
Egypt
 Africa Cup of Nations: (1)
 1957

Zamalek SC
Egypt Cup: (5)
 1951–52, 1954–55, 1956–57, 1957–58, 1958–59
Cairo League: (3)
 1950–51, 1951–52, 1952–53

References 

1928 births
2004 deaths
Egyptian footballers
Egypt international footballers
Zamalek SC players
1957 African Cup of Nations players
Zamalek SC presidents
Egyptian Premier League players
Africa Cup of Nations-winning players
Association football defenders
Mediterranean Games silver medalists for Egypt
Mediterranean Games medalists in football
Footballers at the 1951 Mediterranean Games